Rizky Dwi Febrianto (born 22 February 1997) is an Indonesian professional footballer who plays as a right-back or defensive midfielder for Liga 1 club Arema and the Indonesia national team.

Club career
He made his professional debut in the Liga 1 on April 16, 2017 against Bali United.

On 13 September 2020, he was signed for Arema to play in the 2020 Liga 1. This season was suspended on 27 March 2020 due to the COVID-19 pandemic. The season was abandoned and was declared void on 20 January 2021. On 5 September 2021, he made his league debut in a 1–1 draw against PSM Makassar. On 1 November 2021, he scored his first goal for the club, scoring from the free-kick in the 89th minute, final result, Arema win 2–1 over Madura United in the 2021–22 Liga 1.

International career
He made his international debut for Indonesia U-23 on 7 June 2019 against Thailand U-23 and he scoring against Philippines U-23 on 9 June 2019 at 2019 Merlion Cup.

He made his official international debut for Indonesia national team on 15 December 2021, against Vietnam in a 2020 AFF Championship at a second half replace Asnawi Mangkualam.

Career statistics

Club

International appearances

International goals
International under-23 goals

Honours

Club
Arema
 Indonesia President's Cup: 2022

International
Indonesia
 AFF Championship runner-up: 2020

References

External links
 Rizky Dwi Febrianto at Soccerway
 Rizky Dwi Febrianto at Liga Indonesia

Living people
1997 births
Indonesian footballers
Indonesia youth international footballers
Indonesia international footballers
Association football midfielders
Liga 1 (Indonesia) players
Persekabpas Pasuruan players
Persepam Madura Utama players
Madura United F.C. players
Kalteng Putra F.C. players
Persela Lamongan players
Arema F.C. players
People from Jember Regency
Sportspeople from East Java
21st-century Indonesian people